Stefania Turkewich-Lukianovych (25 April 1898 – 8 April 1977) was a Ukrainian composer, pianist, and musicologist, recognized as Ukraine's first woman composer. Her works were banned in Ukraine by Soviet authorities.

Biography

Childhood 
Stefania Turkewich-Lukianovych was born in Lemburg, Austria-Hungary (now Lviv, Ukraine). Her grandfather Lev Turkevich and her father Ivan Turkevich were priests. Her mother Sofia Kormoshiv was a pianist and studied with Karol Mikuli and Vilém Kurz, and also accompanied the young Solomiya Krushelnytska. The family was musical and everyone played an instrument. Stefania played piano, harp, and harmonium. Later, the composer remembered her childhood and her love of music:

Studies 

Turkewich began her music studies with Vasyl Barvinsky. From 1914 to 1916, she studied the piano in Vienna with Kurz. After World War I, she studied with Adolf Chybiński at the University of Lviv, and also attended his lectures on music theory at the Lviv Conservatory. In 1919 she wrote her first musical work – the Liturgy (Літургію), which was performed several times in St. George's Cathedral in Lviv.

In 1921 Turkewich studied with Guido Adler at the University of Vienna and Joseph Marx at the University of Music and Performing Arts Vienna, from which she graduated in 1923 with a Teacher's Diploma. In 1925 she married Robert Lisovskyi and travelled with him to Berlin, where she lived from 1927 to 1930 and studied with Arnold Schoenberg and Franz Schreker. During this period, in 1927, her daughter Zoya (Зоя) was born.

In 1930 Turkewich travelled to Prague in Czechoslovakia, studied with Zdeněk Nejedlý at Charles University, and with Otakar Šín at the Prague Conservatory. She also studied composition with Vítězslav Novák at the music academy. In autumn 1933 she taught piano and became an accompanist at the Prague Conservatory. In 1934 she defended her doctoral dissertation on the topic of Ukrainian folklore in Russian operas. She received her doctorate in musicology in 1934 from the Ukrainian Free University in Prague. She became the first woman from Galicia (which was then part of Poland) to receive a Ph.D. Returning to Lviv, from 1934 Turkewich worked as a teacher of musical theory and piano at the Lviv Conservatory, and became a member of the Union of Ukrainian Professional Musicians.

War years 
In autumn 1939, after the Soviet annexation of Eastern Galicia and Volhynia, Stefania worked as a tutor and a concertmaster at the Lviv Opera House, and from 1940 to 1941 was associate professor at the Lviv Conservatory. After the closure of the Conservatory during the Nazi occupation, she continued teaching at the State Musical School. In spring 1944 she left Lviv for Vienna. 

Fleeing from the Soviets, in 1946 she moved to southern Austria, and from there to Italy, where her second husband, Nartsiz Lukyanovich, was a physician under the British command.

Postwar life in Britain 
In autumn 1946, Turkewich moved to the United Kingdom, initially living in Brighton before moving to live in London in 1951. She later lived in Barrow Gurney near Bristol from 1952 to 1962, Belfast from 1962, and Cambridge from 1973.

In the late 1940s, Turkewich returned to composing.  From time to time she acted again as a pianist, in particular in 1957 in a series of concerts in Ukrainian communities in Britain, and in 1959 at a concert of piano music in Bristol. She was a member of the British Society of Women-Composers and Musicians (which existed until 1972).

Turkewich's opera Oksana's Heart was performed in Winnipeg (Canada) in 1970 in the Centennial Concert Hall, under the artistic direction of her sister Irena Turkevycz-Martynec.

Death
Turkewich continued to compose through the 1970s. She died on 8 April 1977, in Cambridge.

Compositions
Symphonic works

1. Симфонія – Symphony no. 1 – 1937
2. Симфонія no. 2(a) – Symphony no. 2(a) – 1952
2. Симфонія no. 2(b) (2-гий варіант) – Symphony no. 2(b) (2nd version)
3. Симфонієта – Symphoniette – 1956
4. Три Симфонічні Ескізи – Three Symphonic Sketches – 3-го травня, 1975
5. Симфонічна поема – Symphonic Poem «La Vitа»
6. Space Symphony – 1972
7. Суіта для подвійного струнного оркестру – Suite for Double String Orchestra
8. Fantasy for Double String Orchestra

Ballets

9. Руки – The Girl with the Withered Hands – Bristol, 1957 
10. Перли – The Necklace
11. Весна (Дитячий балет) – Spring – (Children's Ballet) 1934-5
12. Мавка (a) – Mavka – ‘The Forest Nymph’ – 1964-7 – Belfast
12. Мавка (b) – Mavka – ‘The Forest Nymph’ – 1964-7 – Belfast
13. Страхопуд – Scarecrow – 1976

Operas

14. Мавка – Mavka – (unfinished) based on Lesia Ukrainka’s Forest Song

Children’s operas

15. «Цар Ох» або Серце Оксани – Tsar Okh or Heart of Oksana – 1960
16. «Куць» – The Young Devil 
17. «Яринний городчик» – A Vegetable Plot (1969)

Choral works

18. Літургія 1919
19. Psalm to Sheptytsky (Псалом Шептицькому)
20. До Бою
21. Триптих
22. Колискова (А-а, котика нема) 1946

Chamber – Instrumental works

23. Соната для скрипки і фортепіано 1935 – Sonata for violin and piano
24. (a) Cтрунний квартет 1960 – 1970 – String quartet
24. (b) Cтрунний квартет 1960 – 1970 – String quartet
25. Тріо для скрипки, альта і віолончела 1960 – 1970 – Trio for Violin, Viola and Cello	
26. Квінтет для двох скрипок, альта, віолончела  фортепіано 1960 – 1970 – Piano Quintet
27. Тріо для флейти, кларнету, фагота 1972 – Wind Trio

Piano works

28. Варіації на Українську тему  1932 – Variations on a Ukrainian Theme
29. Фантазія: Суїта фортепянна на Українські теми – Fantasia: Suite for Piano on Ukrainian Themes 1940
30. Імпромпту – Impromptu 1962
31. Гротеск – Grotesque 1964
32. Гірська сюїта – Mountain Suite  1966 – 1968
33. Цикл п’єс для дітей – Cycle of Pieces for Children 1936 – 1946
34. Українські коляди та щедрівки – Ukrainian carols and Shchedrivka
35. Вістку голосить – Good Tidings
36. Christmas with Harlequin 1971

Miscellaneous
i. – Серце – Heart – Solo voice with orchestra
ii. – Лорелеї – Lorelei – Narrator, Harmonium and Piano 1919 – words by Lesia Ukrainka
iii. – Май – May – 1912
iv. – Тема народної пісні – Folk Song Themes
v. – На Майдані – Independence Square – piano piece 
vi. – Не піду до леса з конечкамі – Лемківська пісня – Lemky song for voice and strings

References

Bibliography
 Sokil-Rudnytska M. In memory of Stefania Lukiyanovych // Free Word . – Toronto, 1977. – 9 і 16 липня. – С. 3.
 Vovk V. Parastas for Stefania Turkevich-Lukiyanovych // Our Life  – New York, 1992. – Ч. 5. – С. 6–9.
 Stelmashchuk R. Forgotten Lviv neoclassical composer (touches of the creative portrait of Stefania Turkevich) // Music of Halychyna  – Lviv, 1999. – С. 276–281.
 Pavlyshyn S. First Ukrainian female composer // Our Life.  – New York, 2004. – Ч. 1. – С. 14–16.
 Pavlyshyn S. The first Ukrainian female composer: Stefaniya Turkevich-Lisovska-Lukiyanovych.  – Lviv, 2004.
 Karas H. Statics and dynamics of the genre of children's opera in the work of composers of the Ukrainian diaspora of the 20th century. // Bulletin of the State Academy of Managerial Personnel of Culture and Arts.  – Kyiv, 2010. – No. 2. – С. 89–93.
 Yatsiv R. Robert Lisovsky (1893–1982): the spirit of the line.  – Lviv, 2015. – С. 11, 13, 79–84, 91.

1898 births
1977 deaths
Ukrainian classical composers
British composers
British women classical composers
Ukrainian opera composers
Ukrainian music educators
Academic staff of Lviv Conservatory
Lviv Conservatory alumni
Charles University alumni